There are 328 lakes in Jyväskylä, Finland. All of the lakes are listed here. Coordinates are given if there are many lakes with a same name.

Alphabetical listing

A
Ahostenlampi,  Ahvenlampi (coordinates) 14.239.1.004, Ahvenlampi 14.239.1.003, Ahvenus, Ala-Aitolampi, Ala-Kitulampi, Alainen Ruokepuolinen, Alainen Vehkajärvi,  Alalampi, Alvajärvi-Korttajärvi, Ankeriasjärvi, Askeleentakanen, Asmalampi, Auvanen

H
Haapalampi,  Hangasjärvi 14.282.1.001, Hangasjärvi 14.282.1.011, Hanhijärvi, Hanhilampi, Haukilampi 14.317.1.015, Haukilampi 14.285.1.015, Haukilampi 14.295.1.011, Haukkalampi, Heinonen, Heinälampi, Hettee,  Hietajärvi, Hiidenjärvi, Hirvijärvi, Hoikanjärvi, Hoikka, Honkalampi, Huhtalampi, Huhtilampi, Humalalampi, Hupelinlampi, Huujärvi, Höyhenisjärvi

I
Iso Hanslampi, Iso Heinäjärvi, Iso Housujärvi, Iso Joutenlampi, Iso-Kairahta, Iso-Kaukuu, Iso Kalliolampi, Iso Koirajärvi, Iso Koukkujärvi, Iso-Kovalainen, Iso-Kuukkanen, Iso Lampsinjärvi, Iso-Musta, Iso-Peräinen, Iso Peräjärvi, Iso-Soukka, Iso-Vasarainen, Iso Vihtajärvi, Iso Vääräpää, Isojärvi

J
Joutee, Juoneenjärvi, Juurikkaanjärvi

K
Kaakkolampi (14.294.1.008), Kaakkolampi (14.295.1.017), Kaakkolampi (14.298.1.003), Kaakkolampi (14.312.1.006), Kaakonlampi, Kaijanlampi, Kaitajärvi (14.221.1.182), Kaitajärvi (14.221.1.200), Kaitajärvi (14.239.1.007), Kaitajärvi (14.293.1.007), Kaitalampi, Kalaton, Kaleton, Kalliojärvi (14.221.1.166), Kalliojärvi (14.284.1.012), Kalliojärvi (14.286.1.013), Kalliolampi (14.237.1.005), Kalliolampi (14.239.1.006), Kamppijärvi, Kangasjärvi, Kangaslampi (14.294.1.002), Kangaslampi (14.312.1.004), Karhujärvi, Karisjärvi (14.221.1.172), Karisjärvi (14.221.1.195), Kaukkaanlampi, Kauralampi, Kennäälänlampi, Kepolampi, Keski-Kännää, Keskinen, Keskinen Kattilajärvi, Keskinen Naulajärvi, Keskinen Vehkajärvi, Killervä, Kinnaslampi, Kivelän Viemärilampi, Kivijärvi (14.231.1.029), Kivijärvi (14.281.1.004), Kivilampi, Koiralampi, Kolmisoppinen, Kolujärvi, Korpijärvi, Korttajärvi, Koskenlampi, Kotajärvet Isompi, Kotajärvet Pienempi, Kotalampi (14.232.1.004), Kotalampi (14.283.1.009), Kotanen, Koukkujärvi, Koulun Viemärilampi, Kovaslammi, Koveroinen, Kuivalampi, Kukkarojärvi, Kumpulampi, Kumpulampi-Likolampi, Kurppa, Kuusjärvi, Köhniönjärvi, Köntyslampi

L
Lahnajärvi, Lahnalampi, Lapinjärvi, Lautakkojärvi, Lauttalampi (14.231.1.002), Lauttalampi (14.285.1.026), Lehesjärvi-Vähäjärvi, Lehmilampi, Leppävesi, Lepäslampi, Liinalampi (14.296.1.015), Liinalampi (14.311.1.014), Likolampi, Luhtajärvi, Lukkonen, Lummejärvi, Luonetjärvi, Luotojärvi, Löytänelampi

M
Maahinjärvi, Maatianjärvi, Mainiotlammit, Majajärvi (14.293.1.005), Majajärvi (14.296.1.003), Marjojärvi, Masonjärvi, Metsä-Viemärilampi, Moksinjärvi, Moksinmyllylampi, Mustajärvi (14.231.1.018), Mustajärvi (14.285.1.020), Mustalammi, Mustalampi (14.232.1.006) (0,024 km²), Mustalampi (14.285.1.012), Mustalampi (14.285.1.025), Mustalampi (14.291.1.005), Mustalampi (14.295.1.018), Mutalampi, Muurikaisjärvi, Myllyjärvi (14.221.1.187), Myllyjärvi (14.231.1.003), Myllyjärvi (14.232.1.001), Myllyjärvi (14.284.1.013), Myllyjärvi (14.287.1.006), Myllyjärvi (14.293.1.001), Myllyjärvi (14.294.1.009), Myllylampi (14.231.1.005), Myllylampi (14.295.1.014), Mysiönlampi, Mäkijärvi, Mäyrälampi, Mökkilänjärvi, Mörkölampi,

N
Nameless (14.231.1.042), Nameless (14.231.1.043), Nameless (14.274.1.017), Nameless(14.285.1.029), Nameless (14.295.1.013), Naskuttajanlampi, Neulajärvi, Neulalampi, Niemijärvi, Niinijärvi (i), Niinijärvi (p), Nokkoslampi, Nälkäjärvi

O
Onkilampi, Orajärvi,

P
Pahalampi, Pahkalampi, Painaanjärvi, Pajulampi, Palokkajärvi, Palvajärvi, Paskolampi, Patajärvi, Pennijärvi, Perälampi, Pieni Hanslampi, Pieni Hirvijärvi, Pieni Humalajärvi, Pieni Joutenlampi, Pieni Koirajärvi, Pieni-Kairahta, Pieni-Kaukuu, Pieni-Kovalainen, Pieni-Mustalampi, Pieni-Vasarainen, Pieni-Virkanen, Pikku-Lampsi, Pikku-Soukka, Pilkkurilammi, Pirttijärvi (14.221.1.211), Pirttijärvi (14.272.1.004), Pirttijärvi (14.283.1.004), Pirttijärvi (14.286.1.016), Pirttijärvi (14.287.1.008), Pirttilampi, Pitkäjärvi (14.285.1.011), Pitkäjärvi,  Pitkäjärvi (14.317.1.002), Pohjanlampi, Punajärvi, Pyssyjärvi, Pyydysjärvi, Päijänne,

R
Rajajärvi, Raspio,  Rimminjärvi, Rimminlampi, Ruokepuolinen, Ruokepuoliset (i), Ruokepuoliset (l),

S
Saanijärvi, Saarijärvi (14.285.1.010), Saarijärvi (14.286.1.003), Saarijärvi (14.295.1.003), Salmijärvi (14.221.1.193), Salmijärvi (14.287.1.014), Saukkojärvi (e), Saukkojärvi (p), Savilammi, Savilampi, Sipilänjärvi, Sirkkalampi, Soidenlammi, Soidenlampi, Soimalampi, Sompanen, Sonnamanlampi, Suojärvi, Suolijärvi, Surkee, Syväjärvi, Syvälampi, Särkijärvi (14.221.1.205), Särkijärvi (14.283.1.012),
Särkilampi (14.286.1.009), Särkilampi (14.295.1.031), Säynätjärvi, Sääksjärvi (Jyväskylä)
Sääksjärvi

T
Talsanlampi, Tekolampi, Terva-alanen, Tervalampi, Tiehinen, Tuhkuri, Tuohelanjärvi, Tuohikotanen, Tuomiojärvi, Tyyppäälänjärvi Tyyppälänjärvi, Tyystlampi

U
Uittimenjärvi

V
Vaarunjärvi, Valkeajärvi (14.221.1.179), Valkeajärvi (14.221.1.201), Valkeajärvi (14.274.1.008), Valkealampi, Valkeislampi, Valkolampi (14.286.1.024), Valkolampi (14.295.1.049), Varrenvesi,
Varsajärvi, Vasarainen, Vasikkalampi, Vatsajärvi, Vedenpuhdistamo (14.295.2.001), Vedenpuhdistamo (14.295.2.002), Veijonjärvi, Veijonjärvi, Velakallionlampi, Vesankajärvi, Viheriäislammi, Vihtajärvi, Viitalampi, Viljasjärvi, Vinkara, Virkanen, Virolainen, Vuohijärvi, Vuorenalanen, Vuorilampi (14.231.1.038), Vuorilampi (14.291.1.004), Vähä Heinäjärvi,
Vähä Tuomiojärvi, Vähä-Vesanka, Vähäjärvi (14.221.1.207), Vähäjärvi (14.287.1.005), Vääräjärvi (14.295.1.033), Vääräjärvi (14.312.1.003), Väärälampi

Y
Ykshaukinen (14.286.1.006), Ykshaukinen (14.294.1.001), Ylä-Aitolampi, Ylä-Kitulampi, Ylä-Kännää,  Ylä-Sallaajärvi,  Ylä-Tuomiojärvi, Yläinen Kotajärvi, Yläinen Vehkajärvi, Yläinen Vihtajärvi, Ylälampi, Yölampi

Ö
Örö

Ten largest lakes

See also

References

Jyväskylä
Jyväskylä
 
Lakes, Jy
Landforms of Central Finland